There are a good number of publications in Ayyavazhi. Most of them are in Tamil and few in Malayalam and very few in English.

Tamil
There are a good number of books in Tamil in relation to Ayyavazhi both by Ayyavazhi and other Authors. Of that few are below.

Yearly

Monthly 
Kalacchangu
Anbu Murasu
Panchappathi Inimam
Sri Vaikunda Vijayam
Yuka Muzhakkam
Dharmayuga Murasu

Weekly

Other publications 
Akilattirattu Ammanai Parayan Urai
Akilattirattu Ammanai Moolamum Uraiyum, Part-1
Akilattirattu Ammanai Moolamum Uraiyum, Part-1
Ayya Vaikundar Nigalthiya Arpputhangal
Ayya Vaikundar Oor Avatharam
Akilattirattu Ammanai Vilakka Urai, Part-1
Akilattirattu Ammanai Vilakka Urai, Part-2
Santavar Avatharam
Akilattirattu Ammani Deiva Thirumanangal
Nadar kulathil Narayanar Avatharam
Ayya Vaikundar Punitha Varalaru
Ayya Vaikunda Swamikal Punitha Varalaru
Ayya Vaikundarin Akilattirattu Churukkam
Vaikundar Pillaitthamizhl
Mutthiri Patham
Sattu Neetolai Nunporule Vilakkam
Akilam Kakkume Ayya Vaikundar Vralaru
Thamizhakathil Samuga Seerthirutham - Iru Nootrandu Varalaru
Ayyavin Anbu Murasu
Ayya Narayanar
Markcist- Thathuva Idazhl
Muthukutty Narayana Swami
Ayya Vaikundarin Akilattirattu Churukkam
Ayya Vaikundar- Vazhkkai Varalaru
Vaikundar Gnana Mozhikal
Ayya Vaikunda Sami- Theerkkattarisanankal
Ayya Vaikunda Sami – Thiruccenthil Sirappu Malar
Vaikunda Swamigal – Vazhvum Vazhikattalum
Then Kotiyil Oru Samuthaya Puratchi
Akila Arimugam
Vaikundar Makathuvam
Akila Arangam
Akila Aram
Ucchippatippu
Pazhamozhiyum Akilattirumozhiyum
Bagavan Vaikundar Vaibavam
Maanool Vakkum Vazhviyalum
Anbuvazhi ennum Ayyavazhi

Malayalam
Ucchippatippu

English
Religion and Sub-altern agency
Advaita Philosophy of Brahmashri Chattampi Swamikal

See also
List of Ayyavazhi-related articles

Ayyavazhi